Sergio Valech Aldunate (21 October 1927 – 24 November 2010) was the Roman Catholic Auxiliary Bishop Emeritus of the Roman Catholic Archdiocese of Santiago de Chile, Chile. He was the head of the eight-member National Commission on Political Imprisonment and Torture panel in Chile, which investigated instances of torture that occurred under the military regime of Augusto Pinochet. After a six-month investigation, and another six months of preparation, the panel released the Valech Report.

Valech was born in Santiago, Chile. He was ordained priest of Santiago de Chile on 28 June 1953. On 27 August 1973, he was appointed Auxiliary Bishop of Santiago de Chile and Titular Bishop of Zabi. On 18 October 1973 he was ordained Titular Bishop of Zabi. He retired as Auxiliary Bishop of Santiago de Chile on 3 March 2003.

Valech died of lung cancer on 24 November 2010.

References

External links
 Commission of Inquiry:Chile 03 - United States Institute of Peace
 Wikinews report on the release of the Valech Report

1927 births
2010 deaths
Pontifical Catholic University of Chile alumni
20th-century Roman Catholic bishops in Chile
People from Santiago
Deaths from cancer in Chile
21st-century Roman Catholic bishops in Chile
Chilean people of Syrian descent
Chilean people of Basque descent
Roman Catholic bishops of Santiago de Chile